= Ecosave 200 =

Ecosave 200 may refer to three races:

- NASCAR Craftsman Truck Series at Las Vegas Motor Speedway
- NASCAR Craftsman Truck Series at Dover Motor Speedway
- NASCAR Craftsman Truck Series at Charlotte Motor Speedway
